Callisthenia schadei is a moth of the subfamily Arctiinae. It is found in Paraguay.

References

Lithosiini